Roberto Ignacio Poplawski (born 15 March 1998) is an Argentine professional footballer who plays as a midfielder for Estudiantes.

Career
Poplawski began his career with Sunrise Soccer Club before joining Boca United. He then moved to his native Argentina where he signed with Estudiantes, signing a professional contract on 7 June 2019.

On March 3, 2020, it was announced that Poplawski joined USL League One club Orlando City B on loan for the 2020 season. After not playing with Orlando in 2020, Poplawski joined Fort Lauderdale CF prior to the 2021 season on loan. He made his professional debut for the club on April 10, 2021 against the New England Revolution II, coming on as a 60th minute substitute in a 1–0 defeat.

Career statistics

References

External links
 Profile at USL League One

1998 births
Living people
Argentine footballers
Association football midfielders
Estudiantes de La Plata footballers
Orlando City B players
Inter Miami CF II players
USL League One players
Argentine expatriate footballers
Expatriate soccer players in the United States
Soccer players from Florida
Footballers from Buenos Aires